Suhaimi is an Asian name that may refer to
Given name
Suhaimi Anak Sulau (born 1996), Bruneian football defender 
Suhaimi Hassan (died 2013), Malaysian politician 
Suhaimi Kamaruddin, Malaysian politician 
Suhaimi Sulaiman (born 1962), Malaysian news anchor and media strategist 
Suhaimi Yusof (born 1969), Singaporean actor, comedian, entertainer and radio personality 

Patronymic or surname
Abdul Latiff Suhaimi (born 1989), Malaysian football player 
Azalia Suhaimi (born 1985), Malaysian poet, photographer and creative writer 
Azim Izamuddin Suhaimi (born 1997), Bruneian footballer
Hasnul Suhaimi (born 1957), Indonesian telecommunications executive 
Mohamad Faiz Suhaimi (born 1992), Malaysian football defender 
Mohd Iqbal Suhaimi (born 1984), Malaysian football player 
Muhaimin Suhaimi (born 1995), Singaporean football player
Sahil Suhaimi (born 1992), Singaporean football player